Rwanda is divided into five provinces and subdivided into thirty districts.

Provinces 

Rwanda's provinces are:
 Northern Province
 Eastern Province
 Southern Province
 Western Province
 Kigali Province

Prior to 1 January 2006, Rwanda was composed of twelve provinces (known as prefectures up to 2001), but these were abolished in full and redrawn as part of a program of decentralization and reorganization.

See also 
Decentralization in Rwanda
Geography of Rwanda

References 

 
Rwanda
Rwanda